Christine Debra Amor (born 1952) is an Australian actress of stage, television and film.

Career
Amor was born in Brisbane, Queensland. She graduated from the National Institute of Dramatic Art (NIDA). She has acted extensively in television guest roles and in Australian film starting in 1973. Her film roles include Alvin Purple (1973), Petersen (1974), Snapshot (1979). Amor's early television roles include appearances in Matlock Police, Division 4, Certain Women, Bellbird, Chopper Squad, Young Ramsay, Glenview High.

She is possibly best known for her role as social worker Jean Vernon during the 1979 season of Prisoner.

Amor later took a regular role in the Australian version of sitcom Are You Being Served?. She was the female junior in the program's second season in 1981.

Amor was also a leading cast member of the drama series Carson's Law (1983–1984). She later played the role of Miss Chatham in the Australian television series H2O: Just Add Water (2006).

Amor became a Civil Marriage Celebrant working in the state of Queensland.

Filmography

Stage

References

External links
 

1952 births
20th-century Australian actresses
21st-century Australian actresses
Actresses from Brisbane
Australian film actresses
Australian soap opera actresses
Australian stage actresses
Living people
National Institute of Dramatic Art alumni